The Hot Springs Documentary Film Festival is a documentary film festivals held annually in Hot Springs, Arkansas. The festival began in 1991, with a screening of ten Academy Award-nominated documentaries.

Overview 
The festival screens 100 documentaries each year and is recognized by the International Documentary Association and the Academy of Motion Picture Arts and Sciences as one of seven national Academy Award qualifying venues. The festival has held monthly screenings throughout the year and mini-festivals in Fayetteville, El Dorado, Tulsa, Oklahoma and Memphis, Tennessee. It has also collaborated with the Hot Springs Music Festival.

History 
Notable attendees have included Ken Burns, James Whitmore, James Earl Jones, Diane Ladd, Peter Coyote, Louis Black, Tig Notaro, Waad Al-Kateab, Nanfu Wan, Garrett Bradley, Samuel D. Pollard, Freda Kelly, Tess Harper, Chris Strachwitz and Jose Canseco.

In 2014, it was chosen to be an Academy Award Qualifier in the Documentary Short Subject category.

See also
Malco Theatre in Hot Springs, owned by the Hot Springs Documentary Film Institute

References

External links
 Hot Springs Documentary Film Festival

Film festivals in Arkansas
Documentary film festivals in the United States
Hot Springs, Arkansas